Qezeljeh (also Romanized as Qezeljah; also known as Kizildzhakh and Qiziljah) is a village in Saidabad Rural District, in the Central District of Ijrud County, Zanjan Province, Iran. At the 2006 census, its population was 200, in 66 families.

References 

Populated places in Ijrud County